David Satterfield may refer to:

David M. Satterfield (born 1954), American diplomat
Dave E. Satterfield Jr. (1894–1946), U.S. Representative, 1937–1945
David E. Satterfield III (1920–1988), U.S. Representative, 1965–1981

See also
Satterfield